Héctor Libertella (1945–2006) was an Argentine writer.

Works published
The Road of the Hyperboreans, novel, Ed, Buenos Aires, 1968. 
Adventures of Miticistas, novel, Ed Monte Avila, Caracas, 1971. 
People Fighting Pose, novel, Ed Corregidor, Buenos Aires, 1975. 
New Latin American Writing, Essay, Ed Monte Avila, Caracas / Buenos Aires, 1977. 
Cavemen! Stories Abbat Per Ed, Buenos Aires, 1985. 
The International Tour of the Wicked, novella, Latin American Publishing Group, Buenos Aires, 1990. 
Tests or Tests on a Tight Network, essays, Latin American Publishing Group, Buenos Aires, 1990. 
Pathografeia. Diverted Games Literature, Conversations, Latin American Publishing Group, Buenos Aires, 1991. 
The Sacred Writings, Critical Essays, Ed Sudamericana, Buenos Aires, 1993. 
Memoirs of a Demigod, novel, Ed Profile, Buenos Aires, 1998. 
The Tree Saussure, Story-Utopia, Ed Adriana Hidalgo, Buenos Aires, 2000. 
Literal 1973-1977, (ed.), Buenos Aires, Santiago Arcos editor, 2002. 
The Bookseller Argentina, Cordoba, editor Alcyone, 2003. 
The Legend of Jorge Bonino, Córdoba, editor Alcyone, 2010

References

People from Bahía Blanca
Argentine male writers
2006 deaths
1945 births
Burials at La Chacarita Cemetery
International Writing Program alumni